Schierling is a municipality  in the district of Regensburg in Bavaria in Germany.

References

Regensburg (district)